David Power (born September 12, 1944 in Chicago, Illinois; died June 15, 2022) was an American tennis player. He was a two-time All-American tennis player at the Indiana University Bloomington in 1965, 1966, and 1967.

Career
Power won the singles title at the Cincinnati Masters in 1966, defeating Tom Gorman in the semifinals and William Harris in the final.  He also teamed with John Pickens to win the doubles title in Cincinnati in 1965.

Power was ranked as high as No. 25 in singles in the United States, and in 1967 he paired with Will Coghlan to reach the semifinals in doubles at the Australian National Championships.

After playing the circuit, Power became a USPTA Master Professional in 1984 and was the head tennis coach at the University of Cincinnati for nine years (1988–1996). He is the founder and owner of Windward Tennis Academy in Alpharetta, Georgia.

Power was recently inducted into the Athletic Hall of Fame at Indiana University.

References

1944 births
Living people
American male tennis players
Cincinnati Bearcats men's tennis coaches
Indiana Hoosiers men's tennis players
Tennis players from Chicago
Tennis players from Cincinnati
Tennis people from Illinois
Tennis people from Ohio
American tennis coaches